The 1991 Royal Rumble was the fourth annual Royal Rumble professional wrestling pay-per-view (PPV) event produced by the World Wrestling Federation (WWF, now WWE). It took place on January 19, 1991, at the Miami Arena in Miami, Florida. It centered on the Royal Rumble match, a modified battle royal in which participants enter at timed intervals instead of all beginning in the ring at the same time.

Seven matches were contested at  the event, including one dark match. The main event was the 1991 Royal Rumble match, which was won by Hulk Hogan, who last eliminated Earthquake, making Hogan the first multi-time Royal Rumble winner. In other featured matches on the undercard, Sgt. Slaughter defeated The Ultimate Warrior to win the WWF World Heavyweight Championship, Ted DiBiase and Virgil defeated Dusty Rhodes and Dustin Rhodes, The Mountie defeated Koko B. Ware, and The Rockers (Marty Jannetty and Shawn Michaels) defeated The Orient Express (Kato and Tanaka).

Production

Background
The Royal Rumble is an annual gimmick pay-per-view (PPV), produced every January by the World Wrestling Federation (WWF, now WWE) since 1988. It is one of the promotion's original four pay-per-views, along with WrestleMania, SummerSlam, and Survivor Series, which were dubbed the "Big Four". It is named after the Royal Rumble match, a modified battle royal in which the participants enter at timed intervals instead of all beginning in the ring at the same time. The match generally features 30 wrestlers. The 1991 event was the fourth event in the Royal Rumble chronology and was scheduled to be held on January 19, 1991, at the Miami Arena in Miami, Florida.

Storylines
The card consisted of seven matches. The matches resulted from scripted storylines, where wrestlers portrayed heroes, villains, or less distinguishable characters to build tension and culminated in a wrestling match or series of matches. Results were predetermined by WWF's writers, with storylines produced on their weekly television shows, Superstars, Wrestling Challenge, and Prime Time Wrestling.

The main feud heading into the Royal Rumble was between the WWF World Heavyweight Champion The Ultimate Warrior, who had been champion since defeating Hulk Hogan at WrestleMania VI on April 1, 1990, and Sgt. Slaughter, who had returned to the WWF in 1990 and became a villainous (heel) sympathizer of the Iraqi government. Their feud began building during a time when the United States was engaged in Operation Desert Shield (which became Operation Desert Storm on January 17, two days before the Royal Rumble). During the build-up to their match, Slaughter and his manager, General Adnan, cut several anti-American promos to build heat for the event; at one point, Slaughter unwrapped a present and revealed a pair of boots purportedly sent to him by Iraqi dictator Saddam Hussein. In the meantime, "Macho King" Randy Savage challenged Warrior to his own series of matches, which Warrior successfully answered.

Event

Main event matches
The tag team match pitting Ted DiBiase and Virgil against Dusty Rhodes and Rhodes' son, Dustin Rhodes was most notable for Virgil's split from DiBiase. Tensions that had been building between the two in the previous weeks exploded when – after the match – Virgil struck DiBiase in the head with his Million Dollar Championship to turn into a face. DiBiase had verbally abused Virgil throughout the match, and at one point attacked him and threw him from the ring after he was being dominated by the Rhodes' team. DiBiase went on to pin Dusty Rhodes with a roll-up. After the match, DiBiase demanded Virgil bring the Million Dollar Championship into the ring and strap it around his waist. Once he got in the ring, Virgil would drop the belt at DiBiase's feet, to which DiBiase ordered Virgil to pick it up. As DiBiase gloated and then turned back around, Virgil hit him in the face with the championship.

Prior to the Warrior-Slaughter match at the Royal Rumble, Queen Sherri (Savage's valet) attempted to seduce Warrior into granting Savage a title shot. Warrior refused, enraging Savage. During the match itself, Warrior easily fought off a double-team attack by Adnan and Slaughter, running Adnan off before shredding the Iraqi flag and stuffing it into Slaughter's mouth. As Warrior was attempting to finish off Slaughter, Sherri interfered by grabbing Warrior's leg; Warrior chased Sherri down the aisle before he was attacked by Savage near the platform area. Savage struck Warrior with a spotlight as Slaughter regained his senses and distracted the referee. After several minutes of Slaughter holding the advantage, Warrior rallied and set up Slaughter for the gorilla press slam (Warrior's finishing move). However, Warrior grabbed Sherri (who had returned to ringside) and press slammed her onto Savage, who had also appeared at ringside. This gave Slaughter time to hit a knee strike to Warrior's back. Warrior fell into the ropes, where Savage shattered his royal scepter on Warrior's head while the referee was distracted. Slaughter then hit the unconscious Warrior with an elbow drop and pinned him to win the match and championship. After Warrior came to his senses, he ran backstage to find Savage.

The Royal Rumble marked the continuation of an ongoing feud between Hulk Hogan and Earthquake, whose roots dated to mid-1990 when Earthquake injured Hogan in a sneak attack during "The Brother Love Show". Hogan and Earthquake were the final two competitors in the Royal Rumble, and Hogan eliminated Earthquake to win the Royal Rumble.

The pay-per-view broadcast also included featured pre-taped comments from fans outside the arena, wishing United States troops a quick and safe return from the Middle East, and an announcement that Hogan would tour military bases across the country to support the troops.

Reception
In the January 28, 1991 issue of his Wrestling Observer Newsletter, Dave Meltzer referred to the match between The Rockers and The Orient Express as the best WWF pay-per-view match since the WrestleMania III match between Ricky Steamboat and Randy Savage. Meltzer also wrote that he considered it the best WWF pay-per-view to that point in time.

A fan vote in the February 11, 1991 issue of the Wrestling Observer Newsletter had 268 out of 328 fans give the show a thumbs up. 41 gave a thumbs down, while 19 gave a thumbs in the middle. The Rockers vs. The Orient Express received the majority of votes for the show's best match, with 157. Koko B. Ware vs. The Mountie received the most votes for the worst match of the night with 98.

Aftermath
Following his WWF World Heavyweight Championship loss, Warrior focused on revenge against Savage, with their first encounter being a steel cage match on January 21 at Madison Square Garden in New York City, which Savage won (with help from Sensational Sherri); Warrior was enraged and – despite being restrained by several referees and other wrestlers – attacked Sherri after the match by slamming her in the ring. Meanwhile, Warrior was unsuccessful in regaining the title, losing a series of steel cage matches to Slaughter, usually thanks to interference from Sensational Sherri. Warrior and Savage eventually agreed to a "career vs. career match" at WrestleMania VII, which Warrior won. (Slaughter, meanwhile, also defended his belt against "Hacksaw" Jim Duggan, with Duggan winning a majority of these matches by countout or disqualification.)

Hogan, meanwhile, was named the number one contender for Slaughter's WWF World Heavyweight Championship. During a promo that took place right after the Slaughter-Warrior match, Gene Okerlund "received word" that Slaughter was defacing the American flag, to which Hogan vowed that Slaughter's reign as World Heavyweight Champion would be short-lived. At WrestleMania VII, Hogan defeated Slaughter to become WWF World Heavyweight Champion for the third time. (Prior to WrestleMania VII, Hogan defeated Earthquake in a series of "stretcher matches" to finish their feud.)  Though Hogan received a title shot against Sgt. Slaughter in WrestleMania, it wouldn't be until 1993 that the Royal Rumble match winner automatically received a WWF World Title shot at the following WrestleMania.

The Barbarian would begin teaming with Haku for tag team matches, but were both mired in the midcard.  Barbarian would leave WWF in mid-1992 and return to WCW.

Dusty and Dustin Rhodes left the WWF after their match, both returning to WCW, Dusty retired from active wrestling and became a booker and commentator, and Dustin returned to wrestling as "The Natural" and feuding with Larry Zbyszko and later Terry Taylor.  Four years later Dustin would return to the WWF as the androgynous wrestler "GoldDust".

Results

Royal Rumble entrances and eliminations
A new entrant came out approximately every 2 minutes.

Hulk Hogan became the first man to win the Royal Rumble twice.
Rick Martel set a new longevity record with a time of 52:17.
Randy Savage no-showed the match
First time in royal rumble match history where at least one third of the field (10 Participants) all lasted for at least 20 minutes or more during the match

References

External links

1991
1991 in Florida
Events in Miami
Professional wrestling in Miami
1991 WWF pay-per-view events
January 1991 events in the United States